A dormouse is a rodent of the family Gliridae (this family is also variously called Myoxidae or Muscardinidae by different taxonomists). Dormice are nocturnal animals found in Africa, Asia, and Europe. They are named for their long, dormant hibernation period of six months or longer.

The English name of the species derived from the French dormeuse, and the latter in turn possibly from the Languedocien radourmeire.

Etymology

Concerning the dormouse's name, etymonline says "long-tailed Old World rodent noted for its state of semi-hibernation in winter, early 15c., possibly from Anglo-French dormouse 'tending to be dormant' (from stem of dormir 'to sleep,' see dormant), with the second element mistaken for mouse; or perhaps it is from a Middle English dialectal compound of mouse (n.) and Middle French dormir. French dormeuse, fem. of dormeur 'sleeper' is attested only from 17c."

Characteristics
They are generally mouse-like in appearance, but with furred, rather than scaly, tails. They are largely arboreal, agile, and well adapted to climbing. Most species are nocturnal. Dormice have an excellent sense of hearing and signal each other with a variety of vocalisations.

Dormice are omnivorous, and typically feed on berries, flowers, fruits, insects, and nuts. They are unique among rodents in that they lack a cecum, a part of the gut used in other species to ferment vegetable matter. Their dental formula is similar to that of squirrels, although they often lack premolars:

Dormice breed once or occasionally twice each year, producing litters with an average of four young after a gestation period of 22–24 days. They can live for as long as five years. The young are born hairless and helpless, and their eyes do not open until about 18 days after birth. They typically become sexually mature after the end of their first hibernation. Dormice live in small family groups, with home ranges that vary widely between species and depend on the availability of food.

Hibernation

One of the most notable characteristics of those dormice that live in temperate zones is hibernation. They can hibernate six months out of the year, or even longer if the weather does not become warm enough, sometimes waking for brief periods to eat food they had previously stored nearby. During the summer, they accumulate fat in their bodies to nourish them through the hibernation period.

Relationship with humans
The edible dormouse (Glis glis) was considered a delicacy in ancient Rome, either as a savoury appetizer or as a dessert (dipped in honey and poppy seeds). The Romans used a special kind of enclosure, a glirarium, to raise and fatten dormice for the table. It is still considered a delicacy in Slovenia and in several places in Croatia, namely Lika, and the islands of Hvar and Brač. Dormouse fat was believed by the Elizabethans to induce sleep since the animal put on fat before hibernating.

In more recent years dormice have begun to enter the pet trade, though they are uncommon as pets and are considered an exotic pet. The woodland dormouse (Graphiurus murinus) is the most commonly seen species in the pet trade. Asian garden dormice (Eliomys melanurus) are also occasionally kept as pets.

Evolution
The Gliridae are one of the oldest extant rodent families, with a fossil record dating back to the early Eocene. As currently understood, they descended in Europe from early Paleogene ischyromyids such as Microparamys (Sparnacomys) chandoni. The early and middle Eocene genus Eogliravus represents the earliest and most primitive glirid taxon; the oldest species, Eogliravus wildi, is known from isolated teeth from the early Eocene of France and a complete specimen of the early middle Eocene of the Messel pit in Germany. They appear in Africa in the upper Miocene and only relatively recently in Asia. Many types of extinct dormouse species have been identified. During the Pleistocene, giant dormice the size of large rats, Leithia melitensis, lived on the islands of Malta and Sicily.

Classification
The family consists of 29 extant species, in three subfamilies and (arguably) nine genera:

Family Gliridae – Dormice
 Subfamily Glirinae
 Genus Glirulus
 Japanese dormouse, Glirulus japonicus
 Genus Glis
 European edible dormouse, Glis glis
Iranian edible dormouse, Glis persicus
 Subfamily Graphiurinae
 Genus Graphiurus, African dormice
 Angolan African dormouse, Graphiurus angolensis
 Christy's dormouse, Graphiurus christyi
 Walter Verheyen's African dormouse, Graphiurus walterverheyeni 
 Jentink's dormouse, Graphiurus crassicaudatus
 Johnston's African dormouse, Graphiurus johnstoni
 Kellen's dormouse, Graphiurus kelleni
 Lorrain dormouse, Graphiurus lorraineus
 Monard's dormouse, Graphiurus monardi
 Nagtglas's African dormouse, Graphiurus nagtglasii
 Rock dormouse, Graphiurus platyops
 Silent dormouse, Graphiurus surdus
 Small-eared dormouse, Graphiurus microtis
 Spectacled dormouse, Graphiurus ocularis
 Stone dormouse, Graphiurus rupicola
 Woodland dormouse, Graphiurus murinus
 Subfamily Leithiinae
 Genus Chaetocauda
 Chinese dormouse, Chaetocauda sichuanensis
 Genus Dryomys
 Balochistan forest dormouse, Dryomys niethammeri
 Forest dormouse, Dryomys nitedula
 Woolly dormouse, Dryomys laniger
 Genus Eliomys, garden dormice
Asian garden dormouse, Eliomys melanurus
 Garden dormouse, Eliomys quercinus
 Maghreb garden dormouse, Eliomys munbyanus
 Genus Hypnomys† (Balearic dormouse)
 Majorcan giant dormouse, Hypnomys morphaeus†
 Minorcan giant dormouse, Hypnomys mahonensis†
 Genus  Leithia†
 Leithia cartei†
 Maltese giant dormouse, Leithia melitensis†
 Genus Muscardinus
 Hazel dormouse, Muscardinus avellanarius
 Genus Myomimus, mouse-tailed dormice
 Masked mouse-tailed dormouse, Myomimus personatus
 Roach's mouse-tailed dormouse, Myomimus roachi
 Setzer's mouse-tailed dormouse, Myomimus setzeri
 Genus Selevinia
 Desert dormouse, Selevinia betpakdalaensis

Fossil species
 Subfamily Bransatoglirinae
 Genus Bransatoglis
 Bransatoglis adroveri Majorca, Early Oligocene
 Bransatoglis planus Eurasia, Early Oligocene
 Genus Oligodyromys

References

Further reading

External links

 
 
 Glirarium.org 

 
Natural monuments of Japan
Extant Eocene first appearances